Nonviolence International (NI) acts as a network of resource centers that promote the use of nonviolence and nonviolent resistance. They have maintained relationships with activists in a number of countries, with their most recent projects taking place in Palestine, Sudan and Ukraine. They partnered with International Center for Nonviolent Conflict to update Gene Sharp's seminal work on 198 methods of nonviolent action (The Politics of Nonviolent Action) through a book publication. NI has also produced a comprehensive database of nonviolence tactics, which stands as the largest collection of nonviolent tactics in the world. They partner with Rutgers University to provide the largest collection of nonviolence training materials in the world.

History

In 1989, Palestinian activist Mubarak Awad founded Nonviolence International along with co-founders Jonathan Kuttab, Kamal Boulatta and Abdul Aziz Said. Nonviolence International is a 501(c)(3) organization registered in Washington, DC, United States and is continuously active in educating and training the public and activists in the use of nonviolent resistance. They are particularly known for their work in conflict zones and Civil Society at the United Nations, building coalitions to find and advocate for nonviolent solutions across the globe.

Their mission statement is:

 "Nonviolence International advocates for active nonviolence and supports creative constructive nonviolent campaigns worldwide. We are a backbone organization of the nonviolent moment, providing fiscal sponsorship to partners all over the globe. We tell the transformative stories of dynamic emerging nonviolent movements that give us hope in difficult times and are reshaping what we view as possible. By telling these inspirational stories and supporting these movements we help to create a peaceful and just future."

In 1991, Nonviolence International coordinated anti-coup d'état training in Russia. This led to the organization's publication of the Training Manual for Nonviolent Defense Against the Coup d'État, which has since been used globally in both English and Spanish.

In 1993 and 1994, Andre Kamenshikov partnered with Nonviolence International to found the Nonviolence International-Newly Independent States (NI-NIS), based in Moscow.

During the 1995 International Campaign to Ban Landmines, NI was one of the endorsing organizations and was one of the attending parties of the Phnom Penh conference in Cambodia during June 1995. This conference was the largest anti-landmine conference to date and was the first gathering to take place in a heavily mined country (see land mines in Cambodia).

NI organized a groundbreaking consultation entitled "Mainstreaming Peace Teams" at American University in 1996. As a result, more than 50 experts from over 25 countries engaged in dialogue about unarmed peacekeeping and third-party nonviolent intervention.

From 1999 to 2009, NI created programs of nonviolence and peace education in Aceh during the civil war (see Aceh War); the programs were led by Dr. Asna Husin, who remains a senior researcher for Nonviolence International. In 2004, a tsunami ravaged Aceh; the NI office was destroyed and several staff members were killed or injured. Following the tragedy, NI raised and distributed funds for orphans in Aceh.

Between 1998 and 2002, Michael Beer assisted in launching the International Burma Campaign with a conference and publication in Burma Today. Beer, along with Gene Sharp and Bob Helvey, provided training in nonviolent action for over 1,000 Burmese resistance guerrillas and civilians.

NI organized the International Conference on Nonviolent Resistance, which was hosted in Bethlehem in December 2005. The conference brought together over 250 nonviolent activists from around the world, including renowned activists Gene Sharp and Bernard Lafayette.

In 2013 NI expressed a need for a permanent to liaison with the United Nations. In Preparation for the ending of the MDGs and the increasing Demand for accountability in the international community NI promoted David Kirshbaum to Director of the New York Office with the task of fundraising, planning and supporting the struggling Partners. Then in 2014, David Kirshbaum raised the funding, and founded the Nonviolence International New York office (NVINY). Quickly taking on Civil Society leadership in the planning committees of the SDGs and the MGS, the New York office quickly became a champion of the stakeholder system leading and guiding hundreds of new NGOs in the new founded resources on interacting with the United Nations. Rapidly become an active board member of multiple groups at the UN. the NVINY office quickly became known for Holding civil society corruption accountable, and promoting new and unheard voices throughout Civil Society at the United Nations.

From 2006 to 2015, NI organized trainings and produced podcasts, films and texts for the largest resource center on nonviolence produced in Persian.

In 2018 the NVINY changed leadership to NI's youngest Director Joshua Kirshbaum, bridging partnerships across Civil Society at the United Nations. With multiple Peace Educational program under the leadership of Joshua Kirshbaum the New York/UN office has 700+ participants (volunteers, interns, and students) working directly with the United Nations on projects across the globe. the different teams are advocating for nonviolent solutions through peace education and international advocacy; connecting a youth network  of Agents of Change  to Civil Society at the United Nations, through Internship, Mentorship, and Training initiatives.

Nonviolence International currently works on several projects, with focuses on grassroots activism in Sudan, Ukraine, Palestine, & New York City. They are the acting United States fiscal sponsor for the Gaza Freedom Flotillas, which seeks to end the siege of Gaza using nonviolence. Director and founder Mubarak Awad, along with co-founder Jonathan Kuttab, led a delegation to Qatar with Palestinian leadership in order to advocate for a nonviolent strategy of resistance. Michael Beer served as an advisor to the 2019 Sudanese resistance movement and Under Joshua Kirshbaum the New York office has now founded The New York Graduate Plan with unprecedented access and opportunities to the United Nations and the international community for students across the globe.

Organization and affiliations
Nonviolence International operates as a collective of independent offices around the world. Each office manages its own programs and activities.

Within the United States, the central office is located in Washington, D.C.; the organization also has a satellite office in New York City directed by their youngest office head, Joshua Kirshbaum. The NY office in partnership with different civil society coalitions 4 youth-focused programs at the United Nations. With over 150 active Volunteers, interns and students Nonviolence International New York at the Harlem Research Center is the largest Nonviolence International office as yet. Additional international offices are located in Banda Aceh, Jerusalem, Bangkok, Kyiv and Victoria.

In addition to its own programs, the New York teams of Nonviolence International holds leadership positions and membership in a number of other organizations and campaigns, such as the International Campaign Against Foreign Military Bases, The International Action Network on Small Arms (IANSA), NGO Major Group, Coalition for Global Citizenship 2030, War Resisters' International (WRI), and the International Peace Bureau (IPB). They were a supporting organization to both the International Campaign to Ban Landmines (ICBL), which was awarded the Nobel Peace Prize in 1997, and the International Campaign to Abolish Nuclear Weapons (ICAN), which was awarded the Nobel Peace Prize in 2017. NI also acts as a fiscal sponsor for Control Arms, Center for Jewish Nonviolence, We Are Not Numbers, Holy Land Trust, the al Watan Center and many other groups. Additionally, the organization has been widely outspoken against torture and human rights abuses propagated by the United States Government.

Leadership 
Mubarak Awad, the founder and president, is an adjunct professor of nonviolent resistance at American University. He is affiliated with a number of renowned global nonviolent activists such as the Dalai Lama, Archbishop Desmond Tutu and Mairead McGuire. He was born in Jerusalem in 1943 and later chose Bluffton University over Yale University to pursue degrees in social work and psychology. He has since been influenced by Mennonite and Quaker pacifist ideologies. He obtained a master's degree from Saint Francis University and later a PhD in Psychology from Saint Louis University. In 1988, Awad was deported from Palestine for his leadership in helping spark the First Intifada; he is barred from all but short visits to his homeland.

Michael Beer began working with the organization in 1991 and has maintained the executive director position since 1998. Beer is a global activist for human rights and minority rights and has been an outspoken voice for grassroots movements around the world. He focuses on nonviolence training and education and has worked with activists in numerous countries including Myanmar, Kosovo, Indonesia, Thailand, Cambodia, India, Zimbabwe and the United States. He is a frequent public speaker on nonviolence and has been broadcast on C-SPAN, CNN and other major media outlets.

Jonathan Kuttab is a co-founder and prominent civil rights lawyer in Israel, Palestine and New York. Kuttab co-founded the Palestinian Center for the Study of Nonviolence as well as the Mandela Institute for Political Prisoners. He is also a co-founder of Al-Haq, a major Palestinian human rights organization.

Joshua Kirshbaum is the Director of the Nonviolence International New York Office.
In early 2018 Nonviolence International welcomed Joshua to be the youngest office head in the network. Quickly after taking office as the Executive Director of the New York Region, they began to expand and now Joshua and his teams run the Nonviolence International New York Office and the Nonviolence Resource Center in Harlem, Nonviolence Arizona Research Program in Tucson, Arizona, the peacebuilding and VR tech project in Seville, Spain, and The New York Graduate plan. He is an active member and consultant for over a dozen organizations and nonprofits around the world. Over 12 active programs spanning nonviolent action training, youth leadership empowerment, sustainable peace, and international disarmament advocacy and much more. 
for Joshua's young age, he has an extensive history in peacebuilding on an international scale and has been trained by some of the world's leading activists in nonviolence methodology. Joshua's past activities include his work connecting major corporate sponsors with important causes, expanding their philanthropic markets throughout Latin America. Opening a chain of philanthropic projects across South America from his community center "La Casa De La Vida" and "Estudio Ecuador" and the formation of Peace Vision Action Coalition (PeaceVAC), allowing the support of Coalitions and advocacy groups in Civil Society at the United Nations.

Activities
The main focus of the organization is promoting nonviolent solutions through the training and education of individuals, NGOs, and governments. It provides education materials, and sponsors and organizes training and strategy sessions. Specifically the organization:
 Sponsors local, national, regional and international seminars on nonviolence;
 Offers training programs and develops educational materials;
 Provides resources and specialists to groups or governments seeking alternative possibilities for peace;
 Prints and disseminates articles, newsletters, reports and undertakes public interest research on nonviolence;
 Provides public education through speakers and the media;
 Cooperates with other nonviolence, peace and conflict resolution organizations internationally in order to work together toward a common goal.

References

External links

New York Website 
Harlem Resource Center 

Activism
Peace organizations
Non-profit organizations based in Washington, D.C.
Nonviolence organizations based in the United States
Organizations established in 1989
501(c)(3) organizations
Nonviolence
Nonviolence organizations